Jang Deok Cheol (Hangul: 장덕철) is a South Korean vocal group consisting of members Jang Jung-hyeok, Kang Deok-in, and Im Cheol. While the group debuted in 2015, it did not achieve mainstream success until 2017, with the single, "Good Old Days". The single topped South Korean music charts at the beginning of 2018, drawing accusations that the group's label, Limez Entertainment, had manipulated chart rankings.

Discography

Extended plays

Singles

Awards and nominations

Korea Popular Music Awards

MBC Plus X Genie Music Awards

References

External links 
Jang Deok Cheol on Facebook

South Korean pop music groups
Musical groups established in 2015
2015 establishments in South Korea